Coleophora adelogrammella is a moth of the family Coleophoridae. It is found from Fennoscandia to the Iberian Peninsula, Corsica, Italy, North Macedonia and Thrace and from France to Hungary.

The wingspan is 13–15 mm.

The larvae feed on Dianthus sylvestris, Petrorhagia prolifera and Petrorhagia saxifraga. They mine the leaves of their host plant. They create a trivalved tubular silken case of 7-7.5 mm. The mouth has an angle of 30-35°. In spring, the larvae not only mine the leaves, but also the stems.

References

adelogrammella
Moths described in 1849
Moths of Europe